Cassa dei Risparmi di Forlì e della Romagna S.p.A., known as Cariromagna, was an Italian savings bank based in Forlì, Emilia-Romagna region. Despite the bank having become branches of Intesa Sanpaolo in 2018, the former parent company of the bank (before the takeover by Intesa), Fondazione Cassa dei Risparmi di Forlì, as of 2019, is still in operation as a banking foundation and charity organization.

The bank also had former names Cassa di Risparmio di Forlì and Cassa dei Risparmi di Forlì and Cassa dei Risparmi di Forlì S.p.A..

History
Found in 1839 by a decree of Pope Gregory XVI in Forlì, in the Papal States, Cassa di Risparmio di Forlì (Cariforlì in short, renamed to Cassa dei Risparmi di Forlì in 1859) was a savings bank which serves Forlì and the surrounding area.

In 2000, Sanpaolo IMI acquired the bank minority rights to serve as a strategic partner. Banca CR Firenze also acquired minority interests on the bank. On 31 December 2006, Sanpaolo IMI held 38.25% voting rights and share capitals, while Banca CR Firenze held 11.614% ordinary shares and preferred shares worth 1.136% of the shares capital. The banking foundation only retained 28.38% as the second largest shareholder. Private citizens owned 20.62%.

The bank was renamed to Cassa dei Risparmi di Forlì e della Romagna (in short "Cariromagna") on 19 March 2007 to serve for the banking group as a brand in the Romagna region. In the same year Sanpaolo IMI and Banca CR Firenze were merged with Banca Intesa to become one of the two multi-national banking groups of Italy, Intesa Sanpaolo (the other one was UniCredit). Cariromagna received branches from other subsidiaries of the banking group to enhance its branch network in the region.

Followed the announcement of the business plan of Intesa Sanpaolo, the banking group retired the brand Cassa dei Risparmi di Forlì e della Romagna. Intesa Sanpaolo also absorbed the legal person of Cassa dei Risparmi di Forlì e della Romagna in the same year.

Sponsorship
The bank was a sponsor of local football team Forlì F.C., which plays in 2012–13 Lega Pro Seconda Divisione.

Banking foundation
Fondazione Cassa dei Risparmi di Forlì was the original legal entity of the bank, as well as the largest shareholder of the new legal person since 1992. After the bank was acquired by Intesa Sanpaolo, the foundation retained a minority stake. The foundation still served as a charity organization for the Romagna region and the city of Forlì .

See also

 Cassa di Risparmio di Cesena - another bank from the Province of Forlì-Cesena
 Cassa di Risparmio di Ravenna - another bank from Romagna 
 Banca Carim - another bank from Romagna 
 Cassa di Risparmio della Repubblica di San Marino, a bank from the micro-nation San Marino, geographically in Romagna

References

External links
  (now a redirect)
 About Us intesasanpaolo.com
 Fondazione Cassa dei Risparmi di Forlì 

Defunct banks of Italy
Banks established in 1839
1839 establishments in the Papal States
Banks disestablished in 2018
Italian companies disestablished in 2018
Companies based in the Province of Forlì-Cesena
Former Intesa Sanpaolo subsidiaries
Sanpaolo IMI acquisitions
Forlì
Italian companies established in 1839